The Neosho-class oiler was a class of oilers of the United States Navy. They were in commission between 1954 and 1992.

Development 
Neosho-class oilers were built in the 1950s by two shipyards, Bethlehem's Fore River Shipyard and New York Shipbuilding Corporation. The lead ship, USS Neosho, entered service in 1954. Her sister ships were commissioned in the following years.

In the mid-1970s, the Military Sealift Command took over the vessels, and they were redesignated from USS to USNS. The Neosho-class and Mispillion-class oilers were replaced by the Henry J. Kaiser class, with its lead ship, USS Henry J. Kaiser, entering service in 1986.

Ships in the class

See also 

 List of United States Navy ships

References 

 

Neosho-class oilers
Auxiliary replenishment ship classes